Richard Sprigg Jr. (17691806) was an American lawyer, jurist and politician from Prince George's County, Maryland. He represented Maryland in the U.S. House of Representatives and later served as a state court justice.

Sprigg was born about 1769 in Prince George's County, Maryland.  From 1792-1793 Sprigg was a member of the Maryland House of Delegates.

Sprigg was elected to congress in 1796 to fill the vacancy caused by the resignation of Gabriel Duvall.  Sprigg served in the U.S. Congress from 1796 until 1799 and again in 1801 and 1802.

On January 27, 1806, Governor Robert Bowie appointed Sprigg to the newly restructured court of appeals in place of Gabriel Duvall, who had declined appointment a week earlier.

Sprigg died in Charleston, South Carolina, in 1806.

References

External links

1760s births
1806 deaths
People from Prince George's County, Maryland
People of colonial Maryland
Maryland state senators
Members of the Maryland House of Delegates
Democratic-Republican Party members of the United States House of Representatives from Maryland
Sprigg family